Two-fluid model is a macroscopic traffic flow model to represent traffic in a town/city or metropolitan area, put forward in the 1970s by Ilya Prigogine and Robert Herman.

There is also a two-fluid model which helps explain the behavior of superfluid helium.  This model states that there will be two components in liquid helium below its lambda point (the temperature where superfluid forms).  These components are a normal fluid and a superfluid component.  Each liquid has a different density and together their sum makes the total density, which remains constant.  The ratio of superfluid density to the total density increases as the temperature approaches absolute zero.

External links
  Two Fluid Model of Superfluid Helium

References

Mathematical modeling
Traffic flow
Superfluidity